Vijay Krishna Acharya is an Indian film director, screenwriter, dialogue writer known for his works in Hindi films and television shows.

Career
He began as a scriptwriter after his work on  the film  Dhoom Franchise. His directorial debut was the film Tashan which opened to negative reviews. Though his second attempt at film directing Dhoom 3, went on to gross  worldwide in just ten days, to become the highest-grossing Bollywood film of all time in international markets at the time and as of September 2020, it is the twelfth highest-grossing Indian film of all time. It was the 78th highest-grossing film of 2013 worldwide. The film was screened during the 2014 International Film Festival of India in the Celebrating Dance in Indian cinema section. The film won the Telstra People's Choice Award at the 2014 Indian Film Festival of Melbourne.

His first independent spoof was Channel Mast on VI TV, by the late director Sudhanshu Mishra. His other spoofs include Ramkhilavan CM and Family, Public Hai Sab Jaanti Hai and Krishna Sharma CA, which later gave shape to Krishna Arjun. He has written scripts for and directed Hindi shows including Just Mohabbat, Life Nahin Hai Laddoo, Son Pari, Shaka Laka Boom Boom and  Jassi Jaissi Koi Nahin.

Media image
Acharya appreciated the recent Tamil film Varisu for its emotions and action.

Filmography

References

External links
 

Living people
Indian male screenwriters
Hindi-language film directors
Telstra People's Choice Award winners
Yash Raj Films people
Indian television writers
Indian television directors
Kirori Mal College alumni
People from Kanpur
Male television writers
Year of birth missing (living people)